Daria Dorosh (born 1943) is an artist, educator and activist. Born in the Ukraine, she has lived and worked in New York City since 1950. She is among the co-founders, in 1972, of Artists in Residence (A.I.R. Gallery), the first all-female cooperative gallery in the United States. Dorosh's work was part of the inaugural exhibition at A.I.R. Dorosh studied art at the Cooper Union School of Art and Architecture and fashion at Fashion Institute of Technology.

Dorosh served on the faculty of Fashion Institute of Technology from 1969 to 2014 and has received numerous grants and awards for her work as an individual artist, including a National Endowment for the Arts Design Arts grant, a Delaware Valley Arts Alliance Individual Artists grant, and an ArtTable, 30th Anniversary Artist Honors Award.

Dorosh's early exhibitions included small watercolors. Her other works are intersections of art, fashion, and technology Dorosh examines cultural patterns that appear across disciplines. She creates work which questions "the relationship between a work of art, its viewer and the so-called real space in which both are 'confronted.'" Dorosh also uses digital prints in her work.

Her work is in the collection of the Smithsonian American Art Museum.

Her image is included in the iconic 1972 poster  Some Living American Women Artists by Mary Beth Edelson.

References

External links 
 
 A.I.R. Gallery, Daria Dorosh

1943 births
Artists from New York City
Cooper Union alumni
Fashion Institute of Technology alumni
Living people
20th-century American artists
20th-century American women artists
21st-century American artists
21st-century American women artists
Fashion Institute of Technology faculty
Soviet emigrants to the United States